Hope Simpson may refer to:

 Hope Simpson Enquiry, 1929
 Port Hope Simpson, a town in Newfoundland and Labrador, Canada

People with the name
 John Hope Simpson (1868-1961), British politician
 Robert Edgar Hope-Simpson (20th century), general practitioner